

This is a list of the Pennsylvania state historical markers in Cumberland County.

This is intended to be a complete list of the official state historical markers placed in Cumberland County, Pennsylvania by the Pennsylvania Historical and Museum Commission (PHMC). The locations of the historical markers, as well as the latitude and longitude coordinates as provided by the PHMC's database, are included below when available. There are 71 historical markers located in Cumberland County.

Historical markers

See also

List of Pennsylvania state historical markers
National Register of Historic Places listings in Cumberland County, Pennsylvania

References

External links
Pennsylvania Historical Marker Program
Pennsylvania Historical & Museum Commission

.Pennsylvania state historical markers
.State historical markers in Cumberland County
Cumberland County
L
Pennsylvania state historical markers in Cumberland County
L
Tourist attractions in Cumberland County, Pennsylvania